Asok is a common spelling of Ashoka. It may additionally refer to:

 Asok (Dilbert), a character in the Dilbert comic strip
 Asok or Asoke, short name for Asok Montri Road or Sukhumvit Soi 21 in Bangkok
 Asok BTS Station, a BTS skytrain station in Bangkok
 Ašok Murti (born 1962), Serbian wardrobe stylist
 Asok Kumar Ganguly, Indian judge and former chairman of the West Bengal Human Rights Commission
 Asok Kumar Barua, Indian condensed matter physicist